Dominique Johnson (born June 9, 1987) is an American professional basketball player who last played for Dolomiti Energia Trento of the Italian Lega Basket Serie A (LBA).

College career
Johnson played his college basketball at a small and very modest Christian university, called Azusa Pacific University. He is among the rare players that play professional basketball, after coming from a NAIA college school.

Professional career
On November 1, 2010, Johnson was selected in the third round (2010 Annual NBA Development League Draft) by the Idaho Stampede. On January 22, 2011, he joined the team of the Texas Legends, wearing the number 9, in whose colors he spent nearly two full seasons. For the 2011–12 season, Johnson was invited to the Minnesota Timberwolves training camp. He was later waived. In the beginning of the 2012–13 season, Johnson signed a non-guaranteed contract in the NBA, with the Sacramento Kings, for training camp. After being waived, on November 5, 2012, as part of a trade, he was sent to the Santa Cruz Warriors, but the team released him before the regular season competition. Four days later, he played with the Canton Charge. On March 19, 2013, he joined the NBA Development League team in Sioux Falls.

For the 2013–14 season, Johnson made his first trip to Europe, to play for the Polish club Slask Wroclaw, with which he won the Polish Cup title. In September 2014, he signed a contract with the Polish club Siarka Tarnobrzeg, and with them he led the Polish Tauron league in scoring, with 23 points per game, and three-point shooting (51.3%). Johnson ended the 2014–15 season with Maccabi Rishon LeZion

During the 2015–16 season, Johnson played for the Turkish Super League club Banvit BK. In the 2015–16 season, Johnson was 17th in scoring, and 6th in three-pointers made, in the European-wide 2nd-tier level EuroCup. He played with the German club Alba Berlin, in the 2016–17 basketball season.

On July 26, 2017, Johnson signed with Reyer Venezia, of the LBA. On May 2, 2018, Johnson won the European fourth-tier level FIBA Europe Cup championship with Reyer. On August 13, 2018, he inked with Pistoia Basket 2000.

In 2019, Dominique signed with Sporting Al Riyadi Beirut to join the Lebanese Basketball League or 'FLB League' or 'Alfa Lebanese Basketball League'. After his arrival, he won Dubai tournament cup and the Lebanese Cup in April of 2019 and then the Lebanese Championship in May of 2019.

On August 24, 2019, he has signed with Orléans Loiret Basket of the French Pro A.  He signed with Pallalcesto Amatori Udine of the Serie A2 Basket on July 23, 2020. In 2021, Johnson played for Fuerza Regia of the Mexican league and averaged 12.9 points, 2.7 assists, and 1.8 rebounds per game.

On February 22, 2022, he has signed with Dolomiti Energia Trento of the Italian Lega Basket Serie A (LBA).

On May 25, 2022, Johnson was drafted by Killer 3's with the ninth overall pick of the 2022 BIG3 draft.

References

External links
EuroCup Profile
Italian League Profile 

1987 births
Living people
Al Riyadi Club Beirut basketball players
Alba Berlin players
American expatriate basketball people in France
American expatriate basketball people in Germany
American expatriate basketball people in Israel
American expatriate basketball people in Italy
American expatriate basketball people in Lebanon
American expatriate basketball people in Mexico
American expatriate basketball people in Poland
American expatriate basketball people in Turkey
American men's basketball players
Aquila Basket Trento players
Azusa Pacific Cougars men's basketball players
Bandırma B.İ.K. players
Basketball players from Detroit
Canton Charge players
Idaho Stampede players
Junior college men's basketball players in the United States
Lega Basket Serie A players
Maccabi Rishon LeZion basketball players
Osborn High School alumni
Place of birth missing (living people)
Pallacanestro Varese players
Point guards
Reyer Venezia players
Santa Cruz Warriors players
Shooting guards
Siarka Tarnobrzeg (basketball) players
Sioux Falls Skyforce players
Śląsk Wrocław basketball players
Texas Legends players